San Timoteo is a 20th-century parochial church and titular church in the southwest suburbs of Rome, dedicated to Saint Timothy.

History 

The church is square in shape with rounded corners and is covered with a pagoda-style roof. It was built in 1968–70 on land donated by the Società Generale Immobiliare. 

On 14 February 2015, it was made a titular church to be held by a cardinal-priest. 

Cardinal-protectors
 Arlindo Gomes Furtado (2015–present)

References

External links

Titular churches
Roman Catholic churches completed in 1970
20th-century Roman Catholic church buildings in Italy